Carlos Hernández (born January 23, 1971, in Los Angeles, California) is a retired Salvadoran American boxer. He made boxing history by becoming the IBF super featherweight champion by beating David Santos.  Carlos Hernández counted in that fight with the backing up of Alexis Argüello, Roberto Durán and the Salvadoran President, all of whom were at ringside cheering for him. On October 4, 2003, he retained the title against former IBF lightweight champion Steve Forbes, with an eleventh round technical decision.

Hernandez, who moved to the United States in 1991 to reach his goal of becoming a champion, has a record of 43 wins, 8 losses and 1 draw with 24 knockouts. In previous world title tries, he had lost a decision in 12 to Genaro Hernandez and to Floyd Mayweather Jr.

Hernandez lost to Jesús Chávez on May 28, 2005, in a fight that, had he won, would have led him to another world title fight.

On October 8, 2005, he suffered a controversial loss against Bobby Pacquiao, the brother of Manny Pacquiao from the Philippines in a 10-round split decision. Pacquiao managed to drop Hernandez in the 2nd round, but Hernandez fought back consistently starting round 3 to close the fight, or even take the points by 10th. To the eyes of the fans and commentators, it should have gone the other way in favor of Carlos Hernandez, but was still a very close fight to call.

On September 28, 2006, Hernandez announced his retirement after losing by unanimous decision to Kevin Kelley; after an even first 3 rounds, he was knocked down in the 4th round, and unable to regain momentum from then on.

On retirement, Hernandez had this to say: "My time...in this career...if I'm going to get knocked down back-to-back it's time to call it a career. I don't want to get hurt in this business. I have beautiful children....I feel bad that I couldn't win, but you know, I think that everyone who saw me knows I won't get knocked out or I won't go down, I'll keep coming, I'm relentless, I persevere. That's my motto, 'perseverance pays off.' I think I'll just persevere in another career. I don't know what that may be, but I'm going to keep succeeding in life."

In his last bout, Hernandez lost a decision in a brutal war against former Olympian Vicente Escobedo.

Outside the ring

See also 
 More Than Famous

References

External links 
 

1971 births
American sportspeople of Salvadoran descent
International Boxing Federation champions
Super-featherweight boxers
Boxers from Los Angeles
Living people
American male boxers